Tony Hawk's Pro Skater 2x is a 2001 skateboarding video game in the Tony Hawk's series. Developed in a collaboration between Neversoft and Treyarch, and published by Activision under the Activision O2 label, Pro Skater 2x is a re-release featuring the 19 levels from Tony Hawk's Pro Skater and Pro Skater 2, as well as five original levels. Some elements from the then-recently released Pro Skater 3 were included, along with other new features. It was released in North America for Xbox on November 15, 2001 as a launch title for the system.

Gameplay

Tony Hawk's Pro Skater 2x is a skateboarding video game, with an arcade-style emphasis with regard to realism. The objective is to score points by successfully completing various skateboarding tricks such as grinds, flip tricks, and aerials. Performing several moves in succession without any pause results in a combo. The player's score is multiplied by the number of tricks in the combo. If the player successfully lands the final trick the score is then banked, otherwise all points in that combo are lost.

Three "Career" modes are included in the game: both full career modes from Pro Skater and Pro Skater 2, and a shorter career mode exclusive to Pro Skater 2x. Players are tasked with completing objectives in each level within the 2-minute timer. These include achieving a set high score, collecting the letters S-K-A-T-E, performing a certain trick on or over a certain object, and on certain levels, earning a top-three finish in a competition. Completion of these objectives is necessary to unlock new levels, skateboards, hidden characters, and stat points that can be spent to upgrade a character's attributes.

Along with graphical improvements to the game's remade levels and character models, some minor cosmetic changes were made to the environments (such as the addition of an air traffic control tower in the level, "The Hangar"). Some features introduced in Pro Skater 3 were included: female characters could be created in Create-a-skater mode, and a visible balance meter was implemented for grinding. The revert is not included in 2x, but two of its exclusive levels allow for vert tricks to be landed in manuals to similarly extend combos. A "motion-blur" camera effect was included in the game, a feature which would later return to the series with Tony Hawk's Underground 2. Though the game featured no online play, up to eight players could compete via Xbox system link. Point bonuses, which were scattered around the original levels featured in Pro Skater, were removed for this game; unlike in the original game, however, players can utilize the manual on these levels resulting in larger scores.

Reception

The game received generally positive reviews upon release. Jeff Gerstmann of GameSpot called the game "the equivalent of a "director's cut" edition, containing the original product and some nominal enhancements". He went on to say: "While the game is technically the best version of Tony Hawk 2 to date, and while the addition of the Tony Hawk 1 levels is a nice touch, the game feels a little dated, whether you compare it to the rest of the Xbox lineup or the recently released Tony Hawk 3..." Vincent Lopez of IGN stated that "Tony Hawk 2x is exactly what you expect - an amazing translation of Tony Hawk 1 and 2 with extra touches such as more detailed characters, and crisper textures and details on the environments. Unfortunately, because it's exactly what you expect, this isn't a game that can be recommended to everyone."

Blake Fischer reviewed the Xbox version of the game for Next Generation, rating it four stars out of five: "If you've got an Xbox and need some Hawk action, this is great value. But if you've already played the first two games, pick up THPS3 on PS2 (or just wait for it to show up on Xbox)." It was a runner-up in GameSpots annual award category for the best alternative sports console game, losing to Tony Hawk's Pro Skater 3.

References

External links
Tony Hawk's Pro Skater 2x at MobyGames

2001 video games
Activision games
Neversoft games
North America-exclusive video games
Multiplayer and single-player video games
Skateboarding video games
Split-screen multiplayer games
Video games set in France
Video games set in Mexico
Video games set in New York City
Video games set in the United States
Video games set in California
Video games with custom soundtrack support
Xbox games
Xbox-only games
Treyarch games
Video games developed in the United States